Juel is a Nordic surname.

Juel may refer to:

 JUEL, an implementation of Unified Expression Language
 , a Danish navy ship, also called HDMS Juel
 Niels Juel-class corvette, a Danish Navy shipclass, also called Juel class
 Thott Mansion, aka Juel Mansion, Copenhagen, Denmark

See also
 Jewel (disambiguation)
 Juhl (surname)
 Juul (disambiguation)
 Jul (disambiguation)